Vera is a city in the north of the province of Santa Fe, Argentina. It is the head town of the Vera Department and lies 256 km from the provincial capital (Santa Fe). It has a population of about 20,000 inhabitants.

The town was founded in 1891 by M. Leiva and E. Alemán, soon after the arrival of the Ferrocarril Provincial de Santa Fe in February 1890, and became a city on 24 June 1954.

References 
 
 

Populated places in Santa Fe Province